Dehabad (also Romanized as Dehābād and Dahābād) is a village in Khaledabad Rural District, Emamzadeh District, Natanz County, Isfahan Province, Iran. At the 2006 census, its population was 1,791, in 441 families.

References 

Populated places in Natanz County